A History of Babylonia and Assyria is a two volume non-fiction work written by Robert William Rogers and originally published in 1900 or 1901 by Eaton & Mains of New York City. It went through successive rewrites that updated the work and the sixth edition was published in 1915 by Abingdon Press.

Overview
The two volumes are parceled into four books:
Book 1: " Prolegomena, or Discoveries and Decipherments, Sources, Lands,  Peoples, and Chronology of Babylonian History;" 
Book 2: "History of  Babylonia;" 
Book 3: "History of Assyria;" 
Book 4: "History of the Chaldean  Empire."
By 1915 a "largely rewritten" sixth edition was published.

About the author
Robert William Rogers (PH.D, DD., LLD.) was a fellow of the Royal Geographical Society. When he wrote this two volume work, he was a Professor in Drew Theological Seminary in Madison, New Jersey. He published several works including, The Religion of Babylonia and Assyria, Especially in Its Relations with Israel. A lecture series by him was also published in 1931.

See also
Ancient Mesopotamia at the Dawn of Civilization an ancient history monograph by Guillermo Algaze.

References

External links
 Official website.

Ancient Mesopotamia - Babylon and Assyria, Pennfield.edu.

Further reading 

 . Volume 1. Internet Archive.
  Volume 2. Internet Archive.

American non-fiction books
1915 non-fiction books
Books about the ancient Near East
Books about Assyrian people
Ancient history
Assyrian culture
History of Western Asia
Babylonian cities